Brateiu (Transylvanian Saxon dialect: Pretoa) is a commune located in Sibiu County, Transylvania, Romania. It is composed of two villages, Brateiu and Buzd, each of which has a  fortified church. There is a burial ground located here which is dated to the 4th century. The Daco-Roman cemetery is situated on the bank of the Târnava Mare river, and is estimated to date to between 380–454 AD.

At the 2011 Romanian census, 57% of inhabitants were Romanians, 41% Roma, and 1% Germans (more specifically Transylvanian Saxons) and Hungarians each.

Gallery

References 

Communes in Sibiu County
Localities in Transylvania